The development regions of Romania refer to the eight regional divisions created in Romania in 1998 in order to better co-ordinate regional development as Romania progressed towards accession to the European Union (EU). The development regions correspond to NUTS 2-level divisions in EU member states. Despite becoming increasingly significant in regional development projects, Romania's development regions do not actually have an administrative status and do not have a legislative or executive council or government. Rather, they serve a function for allocating EU PHARE funds for regional development, as well as for collection of regional statistics. They also co-ordinate a range of regional development projects and became members of the Committee of the Regions when Romania joined the EU on January 1, 2007.

List
There are eight development regions in Romania, which (with the exception of București-Ilfov) are named by their geographical position in the country:
RO1 – Macroregiunea Unu:
Nord-Vest – RO11; 6 counties; 2,521,793 inhabitants; 
Centru – RO12; 6 counties; 2,271,066 inhabitants; 
RO2 – Macroregiunea Doi:
Nord-Est – RO21; 6 counties; 3,226,436 inhabitants; 
Sud-Est – RO22; 6 counties; 2,367,987 inhabitants; 
RO3 – Macroregiunea Trei:
Sud - Muntenia – RO31; 7 counties; 2,864,337 inhabitants; 
București - Ilfov – RO32; 1 county and Bucharest; 2,259,669 inhabitants; 
RO4 – Macroregiunea Patru:
Sud-Vest Oltenia – RO41; 5 counties; 1,873,606 inhabitants; 
Vest – RO42; 4 counties; 1,668,921 inhabitants;

Economy

See also

Administrative divisions of Romania
Region (Europe)
Nomenclature of Territorial Units for Statistics
Historical regions of Romania

References

Economic regions
 
Geography of Romania
Romania geography-related lists